Edit is the sixth  album by British singer Mark Stewart, released on 28 March 2008 through Crippled Dick Hot Wax!.

Accolades

Track listing

Personnel 
Musicians
Jazzwad – instruments
The Maffia
Keith LeBlanc – drums
Skip McDonald – guitar
Adrian Sherwood – keyboards, production, mixing, recording
Doug Wimbish – bass guitar
Kevin Martin – instruments, production
Simon Mundey – instruments
Nick Riggio – instruments
Mark Stewart – vocals, production, mixing, recording
Sanjay Tailor – instruments
Crucial Tony – instruments

Additional musicians and production
Eric D. Clark – engineering
Nick Coplowe – production
Cem Oral – mastering, engineering
Philipp Quehenberger – production
Peter Rehberg – engineering

References

External links 
 

2008 albums
Mark Stewart (English musician) albums
Albums produced by Adrian Sherwood